A referendum on the enlargement of the European Communities (EC) was held in France on 23 April 1972. Voters were asked whether they approved of Denmark, Ireland, Norway and the United Kingdom joining the EC, although Norway later voted in its own referendum not to join. The proposals were approved by 68.3% of voters, with a turnout of 60.2%.

The referendum asked: "Do you agree with the new opportunities opening up in Europe, the draft law submitted to the French people by the President of the Republic, and authorising the ratification of the Treaty concerning the accession of United Kingdom, Denmark, Ireland and Norway to the European Communities?"

This was the first referendum to be held in any country relating to an issue regarding the European Communities.

Results

References

1972 in France
1972
1972 referendums
1972 elections in France
Referendums related to European Union accession
1972 in international relations
1972 in the European Economic Community
France and the European Union
France–United Kingdom relations
Denmark–France relations
France–Ireland relations